John Evans (born 10 September 1950) is a former  Australian rules footballer who played with St Kilda in the Victorian Football League (VFL).

Notes

External links 

Living people
1950 births
Australian rules footballers from Victoria (Australia)
St Kilda Football Club players